This is a list of executive producers and head writers for the soap opera Days of Our Lives.

Executive Producers

Head writers

Notes 

  Exact switchover dates from 1989–98 are unknown due to many episodes airing without credits during those years. The start dates for all writers from 1989–98 are for the first episode credited to them on screen. The 27 "uncredited episodes" (which are credited as the previous writer's end date in all cases) are March 13–14, 1989, January 18–19, 1990, June 14–18, 1991, January 30, 1992, June 9–11, 1992; July 9, 1992; December 16–18, 1992; April 26–28, 1993, November 20, 1997. and December 23, 1997 – January 5, 1998.
  March 13–14, 1989. means Leah Laiman was last credited on screen on March 10, 1989; no credits were run from March 13–14, 1989. Anne Howard Bailey was first credited on March 15, 1989; Laiman gets the "uncredited episodes" added to her official count and her end date is listed as March 12, 1989, but Bailey may have actually written one or both of those two "uncredited" episodes).

References

Days of Our Lives
Days of Our Lives